Sport Lisboa e Olivais is a Portuguese sports club from Lisbon.

The men's futsal team plays in Portuguese Futsal First Division.

The men's football team plays in the I Série 2 AF Lisboa. The team played on the fourth-tier Terceira Divisão in 1994–95 and from 1996 to 1999. The team also participated in the Taça de Portugal.

Honours

Futsal
National
Taça de Portugal de Futsal:
Winner (1): 2003–04
SuperTaça de Futsal de Portugal:
Runner-up (1): 2004

References

 Official website
 Zerozero

Football clubs in Portugal
Futsal clubs in Portugal
Association football clubs established in 1934
1934 establishments in Portugal